"All the Love in the World" is a song by Irish pop rock group the Corrs, taken from their third studio album In Blue (2000). It was released on 11 June 2001 as a promotional single to the 2001 romantic comedy film America's Sweethearts. The song was written by the Corrs and co-written and produced by Robert John "Mutt" Lange. "All the Love in the World" is a soft rock ballad about desiring lifelong love. Critics were divided with the song; some picked it as one of the best tracks on the album, but others felt it was banal and weak.

Background and release
"All the Love in the World" was originally included on the Corrs third studio album In Blue (2000). The song was later included on the soundtrack of the 2001 romantic comedy film America's Sweethearts, starring Julia Roberts, Catherine Zeta-Jones and John Cusack. It was released as a promotional single to the film, with a remix version being available in its soundtrack and in a promotional single (which includes the album version, as well), and with a music video with scenes of the film being released to further promote it.

"All the Love in the World" was written by the Corrs (Andrea, Caroline, Sharon and Jim), while Robert John "Mutt" Lange co-wrote and produced the song. The pop ballad talks about desiring lifelong love. The remix version was included on their compilation album, "Best of The Corrs" (2001).

Reception

Critical response
The song received mixed reviews from music critics. Steven McDonald of Allmusic picked the song as one of the best tracks on "In Blue" and the "America's Sweethearts Soundtrack. For Lydia Vanderloo of Barnes & Nobles, "Songs such as the soft-rock ballad 'All the Love in the World' use the subtle, graceful strains of these lovely instruments without throwing their finely calibrated pop songs out of whack." Kevin Oliver of PopMatters commented, "Lange's heavy hand is evident in Spice Girls-lite balladry like, 'All the Love in the World'."

David Browne of Entertainment Weekly was negative, calling the song "banal," comparing the song to "adult contemporary radio fodder that feels very 1991," citing that the song "is awaiting Celine Dion's return." Jane Stevenson of Jam! considered "All the Love in the World" "one of the album's weaker songs."

Commercial performance
"All the Love in the World" spent eight weeks on the US Adult Contemporary chart, reaching number 24.

Music video
The music video featured the band members as actors in different movie sets. Footage from the America's Sweethearts movie were also shown.

Track listingUS promo CD'
 "All the Love in the World" (Robert John "Mutt" Lange remix) – 3:55
 "All in a Day" (live at Wembley) – 4:06	
 "All the Love in the World" (live at Wembley) – 4:34

Charts

Release history

References

The Corrs songs
143 Records singles
2001 singles
2000 songs
Atlantic Records singles
Lava Records singles
Music videos directed by Darren Grant
Song recordings produced by Robert John "Mutt" Lange
Songs written by Andrea Corr
Songs written by Caroline Corr
Songs written by Jim Corr
Songs written by Robert John "Mutt" Lange
Songs written by Sharon Corr